The 1989–1990 season was the 111th season in Bolton Wanderers F.C.'s existence, and their second successive season in the Football League Third Division. It covers the period from 1 July 1989 to 30 June 1990.

League table

Bolton Wanderers
Bolton Wanderers F.C. seasons